The 1958 Harelbeke–Antwerp–Harelbeke was the inaugural edition of the E3 Harelbeke cycle race and was held on 3 May 1958. The race started and finished in Harelbeke. The race was won by Armand Desmet.

General classification

Notes

References

1958 in Belgian sport
1958